Daleth of Elphame EP is a 2002 EP by The Orb released on Badorb.com. It was the only EP/single released by Badorb.com on CD.

Track listing

I Am the Red Worm (5:11)
Cool Harbour (5:18)
Outer Space (8:13)

References

External links

The Orb albums
2002 EPs